Jordan Tyler Simpson (born 28 November 1998) is an English professional footballer who plays for Ashton United as a midfielder.

Club career
Son of former Jamaican international, Fitzroy Simpson, Simpson joined local side Swindon Town at the age of six in 2004 and signed his first professional contract in March 2017 along with Scott Twine and Tommy Ouldridge. Five days after signing, Simpson featured as an unused substitute during Swindon's 4–2 home defeat against Sheffield United.

Following the appointment of David Flitcroft, Simpson was free to leave Swindon and in July 2017 he joined newly promoted Forest Green Rovers on a two-year deal. On 1 September 2017, Simpson joined National League South side Hungerford Town on a short-term loan. A day later, he made his debut in their 2–0 home victory over Concord Rangers, replacing Louie Soares in the 69th minute.

Following a loan spell at Hungerford, Simpson made his Forest Green debut in their 2–0 home defeat against Luton Town, playing the full 90 minutes.

On 6 September 2018, Simpson joined National League side, Havant & Waterlooville on a one-month loan and made his debut during a 3–2 defeat to Harrogate Town two days later.

On 22 March 2019, Simpson joined National League South side, Hampton & Richmond Borough on loan for the remainder of the campaign and went onto feature four times before returning to Forest Green in May. He was released by Forest Green Rovers at the end of the 2018–19 season.

On 19 June 2019, Simpson signed for Bath City.

On 23 October 2020 F.C. United of Manchester announced that Simpson had signed for the club. Simpspn made his debut on 24 October in the 4th qualifying round of the FA Cup against Guiseley A.F.C. where F.C. United won 2–1 to qualify for the first round proper of the competition.

In October 2021 he joined Macclesfield after his release from FC United.

On 16 December 2021, Simpson signed for Northern Premier League Premier Division side Ashton United.

Career statistics

References

1998 births
Living people
English footballers
English people of Jamaican descent
Association football midfielders
Swindon Town F.C. players
Forest Green Rovers F.C. players
Hungerford Town F.C. players
Havant & Waterlooville F.C. players
Hampton & Richmond Borough F.C. players
Bath City F.C. players
National League (English football) players
English Football League players
Sportspeople from Swindon
F.C. United of Manchester players
Macclesfield F.C. players
Ashton United F.C. players